Simat-Ištaran was a daughter of King Ur-Nammu, who was the first king of Ur-III Dynasty in Mesopotamia, at the end of the third millennium BC. Simat-Ištaran is mainly known from cuneiform texts coming from Garšana. Accordingly to those texts she was married to the general and physician Ŝu-Kabta. This connection is never explicitly mentioned within the texts, but can be inferred. This marriage documents how the Ur III Dynasty kings married family members to various important people in the empire.  After the death of her husband, Simat-Ištaran inherited his estate and continued to manage it alone.

References 

Third Dynasty of Ur
21st-century BC women